Firuzbahram Rural District is in Chahardangeh District of Eslamshahr County, Tehran province, Iran. At the National Census of 2006, its population was 10,882 in 2,780 households. There were 11,501 inhabitants in 3,183 households at the following census of 2011. At the most recent census of 2016, the population of the rural district was 9,074 in 3,053 households. The largest of its five villages was Gol Dasteh, with 7,602 people.

References 

Eslamshahr County

Rural Districts of Tehran Province

Populated places in Tehran Province

Populated places in Eslamshahr County